Edward Bligh, 5th Earl of Darnley, FRS (25 February 1795 – 12 February 1835), styled Lord Clifton until 1831, lord of the Manor of Cobham, Kent, was a British peer and politician.

Background
Darnley was the second but eldest surviving son of John Bligh, 4th Earl of Darnley, and Elizabeth Brownlow, 3rd daughter of the Rt Hon. William Brownlow. He was educated at Eton College and Christ Church, Oxford, matriculating on 22 October 1812, where he took degrees of Bachelor of Arts (BA) in 1816, proceeding Master of Arts (MA) in 1819.

Political career
Darnley was returned to the House of Commons representing Canterbury in 1818, a seat he held until 1830 for the Whig Party. In 1831 he succeeded his father in the earldom and took his seat in the House of Lords. He also served as Lord Lieutenant of County Meath between 1831 and 1835, and was elected a Fellow of the Royal Society in 1833.

Marriage and children

In 1825 he married the Hon. Emma Jane Parnell, a daughter of Henry Parnell, 1st Baron Congleton, by whom he had three sons and two daughters:
John Bligh, 6th Earl of Darnley (1827–1896)
Rev. Hon. Edward Vesey Bligh (1829–1908)
Lady Elizabeth Caroline Bligh (1830–1914), who married Sir Reginald Cust (1828–1912) on 13 December 1855 and had issue, including the courtier Sir Lionel Cust. She was a historian and genealogist, who (as "Lady Elizabeth Cust") was the author of Some Account of the Stuarts of Aubigny, in France, London, 1891 (her ancestors at Cobham Hall), and of  Records of the Cust family of Pinchbeck, Stamford and Belton in Lincolnshire, 1479-1700, 3 vols, 1898.
Lady Emma Bess Bligh (1832–1917), married Arthur Purey-Cust on 6 June 1854 and had issue
Rev. Henry Bligh (10 June 1834 – 4 March 1905), vicar of St James' Church, Hampton Hill 1881–1893 and Holy Trinity Church, Fareham 1893–1900, married first Emma Armytage (d. 27 December 1881) and second Anne Elizabeth Dobree Butler, and had issue by both

Darnley died of lockjaw after an axe injury when felling timber on his estate at Cobham Hall, Kent, in February 1835, aged 39, and was buried at Cobham.  He was succeeded in the earldom by his eldest son, John.

His wife, Emma, Dowager Countess of Darnley, died on 15 March 1884.

See also 
 Earl of Darnley

References

External links 
 
"Hon. Emma Jane Parnell" at The Peerage – portrait of Emma, Countess of Darnley

1795 births
1835 deaths
Edward 05
People educated at Eton College
Alumni of Christ Church, Oxford
Members of the Parliament of the United Kingdom for English constituencies
UK MPs 1818–1820
UK MPs 1820–1826
UK MPs 1826–1830
UK MPs who inherited peerages
Lord-Lieutenants of Meath
Fellows of the Royal Society
Edward 05
Barons Clifton
Deaths from tetanus